Cabot Education Centre is a secondary school located in Neil's Harbour, Nova Scotia, Canada, on northern Cape Breton Island in Victoria County.  It is governed by the Cape Breton – Victoria Regional School Board.

Overview
The 2008-09 enrollment of the school was 235 students, with 113 at the junior level and 122 at the senior high level.  It is reportedly the only school in Nova Scotia where 100% of students are bused to school.

A major addition was completed in 1988–89, adding several new classrooms and a new cafeteria.

Sports
In 1993, National Soccer Hall of Fame member George Brown coached the girls soccer team to the Provincial Championship.

References

External links
 Cabot Education Centre
 Photograph of entrance to school on Google Maps

High schools in Nova Scotia
Schools in Victoria County, Nova Scotia